Boadicea and Her Daughters is a bronze sculptural group in London representing Boudica, queen of the Celtic Iceni tribe, who led an uprising in Roman Britain. It is located to the north side of the western end of Westminster Bridge, near Portcullis House and Westminster Pier, facing Big Ben and the Palace of Westminster across the road. It is considered the magnum opus of its sculptor, the English artist and engineer Thomas Thornycroft. Thornycroft worked on it from 1856 until shortly before his death in 1885, sometimes assisted by his son William Hamo Thornycroft, but it was not erected in its current position until 1902.

Design
The statue portrays Boudica (commonly written as "Boadicea" in the Victorian era), Queen of the Iceni tribe of Britons, accompanied by her two daughters, mounted on a scythed chariot drawn by two rearing horses. The chariot is based on Roman models, not native British or Iceni models, and has a scythe blade attached to each wheel. She stands upright, in a flowing gown, with a spear in her right hand and her left hand raised. Her daughters with bared breasts crouch in the chariot, one to either side of their mother. None of them holds reins to control the horses.

Construction

The statue was commissioned in the 1850s, after Thornycroft made an equestrian statue of Queen Victoria which was exhibited at the Great Exhibition in 1851. The statue was praised by Queen Victoria and Prince Albert, and they were involved with Thornycroft's new project. Albert intended the monumental statue to be erected over the central arch of Decimus Burton's entrance to Hyde Park, and asked Thornycroft to make a "throne upon wheels". Parallels were drawn between Victoria and Boudica, whose name also means "victory". Albert lent two horses as models, and the statue bears some resemblance to a young Queen Victoria. Albert died in 1861 before the statue was completed.

Thornycroft completed a full size model of the work before his death in 1885, but there was no funding for it to be cast in bronze. An earthwork known as "Boadicea's Grave" on the north side of Parliament Hill was excavated in 1894, although no grave was found, but Thornycroft's son, John Isaac Thornycroft suggested the site would be appropriate for the location of his father's long-delayed monumental statue, but £6,000 for the casting in bronze was still not available. A committee was formed to raise funds by subscription. The necessary money was raised by 1898, and the statue was cast by the founder J. W. Singer in Frome for just £2,000, although there was still no site for it to be erected.

Installation

Thornycroft's statue was not installed until 1902, more than 17 years after his death. It was erected at Westminster Pier in June 1902, mounted on a large granite plinth by Thomas Graham Jackson. Inscriptions were added to the plinth in 1903; that on the front of the plinth reads / )/ / / / . The right side of the plinth contains an inscription with text from William Cowper's poem Boadicea, an ode (1782): / . An inscription on the plinth's left side reads, / / / / .

The statue is located in a busy position, with traffic from the Embankment and many pedestrian tourists passing from the Westminster Abbey, Parliament Square and Whitehall to the west over the bridge past the South Bank Lion towards County Hall, the London Eye, and Jubilee Gardens on the South Bank. Its plinth is often obscured behind a souvenir stall. It became a Grade II listed building in 1958.

See also

 1902 in art
 List of public art on the Victoria Embankment

References
 Specific

 General
 Boudica, Vanessa Collingridge, Random House, 2012, pp. 370–375.
 Boudica: Iron Age Warrior Queen, Richard Hingley, Christina Unwin, A. & C. Black, 2006, pp. 162–165.
 The queen of British hearts, The Telegraph, 13 March 2005
 Images of Women in Peace and War: Cross-cultural and Historical Perspectives, Sharon Macdonald, Pat Holden, Shirley Ardener, University of Wisconsin Press, 1988, pp. 53–55.
 Title History of the Boadicea group [by T. Thornycroft] erected 1902 [on the Victoria embankment], Thomas Thornycroft, Compiled by L. Priddle, 1902 
 Title Warrior Queens: Boadicea's Chariot, Antonia Fraser, Hachette UK, 2011, pp. 196–197.
 The Historical Journal / Volume 57 / Issue 02 / June 2014, pp. 485–508.
 Bare-breasted on Westminster Bridge
 Boadicea/Boudicca

External links

 Statue of Boadicea – London, UK at Waymarking.com

1902 establishments in the United Kingdom
1902 sculptures
Bronze sculptures in the United Kingdom
Cultural depictions of Boudica
Grade II listed statues in the City of Westminster
Horses in art
Monuments and memorials in London
Monuments and memorials to women
Outdoor sculptures in London
Victoria Embankment
Sculptures of women in the United Kingdom